Mary Jane's Pa is a 1917 American silent drama film directed by Charles Brabin and William P.S. Earle and starring Marc McDermott, Mildred Manning and Eulalie Jensen.

It is based on the 1906 play Mary Jane's Pa by Edith Ellis, later adapted into a 1935 sound film of the same title.

Cast
 Marc McDermott as Hiram Perkins
 Mildred Manning as Mary Jane
 Eulalie Jensen as Portia Perkins
 Emmett King as Rome Preston
 Clio Ayres as Lucille Perkins
 William R. Dunn as Barrett Sheridan
 Templar Saxe as Joel Skinner

References

Bibliography
Parish, James Robert & Pitts, Michael R. . Film Directors: A Guide to their American Films. Scarecrow Press, 1974.

External links
 

1917 films
1917 drama films
1910s English-language films
American silent feature films
Silent American drama films
American black-and-white films
Films directed by Charles Brabin
Films directed by William P. S. Earle
Vitagraph Studios films
1910s American films